Arcobacter halophilus is a species of obligate halophilic bacteria. It is Gram-negative, and its type strain is LA31BT(=ATCC BAA-1022T =CIP 108450T).

References

Further reading

External links
LPSN

Type strain of Arcobacter halophilus at BacDive -  the Bacterial Diversity Metadatabase

Campylobacterota
Bacteria described in 2005